The  European Union, Latin America and the Caribbean Summit (EU–LAC) is a biennial meeting of heads of state and government of Latin America, the Caribbean and the European Union. In the first EU–LAC summit, held in Rio de Janeiro between 28 June and 29 June 1999, participant nations agreed to develop a strategic partnership focused on strengthening democracy, the rule of law, international peace and political stability.
The second meeting was carried out in Madrid in 2002, the third in Guadalajara in 2004, the fourth in Vienna in 2006 and the fifth was held in Lima in mid-May 2008. Major topics discussed at the Lima summit were free trade, food prices, which leaders were "deeply concerned by" and poverty, and sustainable development. The results of the event were rather disappointing, as very little was achieved. The next round of talks took place in Brussels in June 2008. The sixth summit was held in Madrid in 2010. At this Summit, the Heads of State of the Latin America, Caribbean and European Union countries decided to create the EU–LAC Foundation as a tool to strengthen the biregional partnership.

Summits 
EU–LAC Summits
 1st Summit: 1999 in Rio de Janeiro
 2nd Summit: 2002 in Madrid
 3rd Summit: 2004 in Guadalajara
 4th Summit: 2006 in Vienna
 5th Summit: 2008 in Lima
 6th Summit: 2010 in Madrid
EU–CELAC Summits
 : 2013 in Santiago de Chile
 : 2015 in Brussels

See also
 EU–LAC Foundation
 CARIFORUM
 Eurosphere
 ACP countries

References

External links
 Official website of the European Union, Latin America and the Caribbean Foundation
 European Commission site on the EU - LAC Lima Summit 2008
 Official website of the V Latin America, the Caribbean and the European Union Summit

European Union and third organisations
Foreign relations of the Caribbean
20th-century diplomatic conferences
21st-century diplomatic conferences
1999 in international relations
1999 conferences
2002 in international relations
2002 conferences
2004 in international relations
2004 conferences
2006 in international relations
2006 conferences
2008 in international relations
2008 conferences
Biennial events
Latin America and the Caribbean